Built in 2007, Potomac  is the seventh  built for Vane Brothers Company. Potomac was designed by Frank Basile of Entech & Associates, and built by Thoma-Sea Boat Builders in Houma, Louisiana.

References

Tugboats of the United States
2007 ships